Bufotes oblongus, the Eastern Persian toad, Central Asian toad, is a species of toad in the family Bufonidae. It is found in eastern and central Iran north to adjacent parts of Turkmenistan. Its natural habitats are subtropical or tropical dry shrubland, freshwater marshes, and freshwater springs.

References

oblongus
Amphibians described in 1896
Amphibians of Iran
Fauna of Turkmenistan
Taxonomy articles created by Polbot
Taxa named by Alexander Nikolsky